Afonso Cláudio de Freitas Rosa (August 2, 1859 – June 16, 1934), or simply Afonso Cláudio, as he was better known by the people, was, for a brief time, the first president (governor, actually) of the Brazilian state of Espírito Santo. He was inaugurated as governor on November 22, 1889, and remained on the function until January 7, 1890.

He was born to landowner parents in the rural zone of central Espírito Santo. He studied at a university in Pernambuco, Northeast Brazil, where he graduated in Laws in 1883. Back to Espírito Santo, he radicated at its capital, Vitória, where he worked as a public law enforcer.

At some point of his younger years, he joined the movement for the abolition of the slavery in Brazil, and became a Republican conspirator also. Afonso Cláudio was also a supporter of the European immigration to Espírito Santo.

Following the Republican coup d'état that put an end to the Empire of Brazil, Afonso Cláudio was appointed president of Espírito Santo by the new-installed government. He occupied the office for a brief time though, being appointed later for the state's Court of Justice, which he presided as well.

Afonso Cláudio was also a teacher (Professor of Law at the Law School of Niterói, Fluminense Federal University), a poet and writer, being his most important books History of Espirito-Santensis Literature, Rhimes and Songs of Espírito Santo and The Insurrection of Queimado, an essay on the slave rebellion that took place on Espírito Santo in 1849.

References

Site of the State's Secretary for Treasure of Espirito Santo, Page for Espírito Santo's Literature and Poetry (in Portuguese)
Espirito-Santensis Station, Researches (in Portuguese)

Governors of Espírito Santo
1859 births
1934 deaths
Brazilian abolitionists